Simón Bolívar District is one of thirteen districts of the province Pasco in Peru.

See also 
 Allqaqucha
 Kuchpanqa
 Luliqucha
 Pumaqucha

References